Christ Church Episcopal School (CCES) is a K–12 private, Episcopal, college-preparatory school in Greenville, South Carolina, United States. It was established in 1959.

References

External links 
 

Private elementary schools in South Carolina
Private middle schools in South Carolina
Private high schools in South Carolina
Preparatory schools in South Carolina
Education in Greenville, South Carolina
Episcopal Church in South Carolina
Episcopal schools in the United States
Educational institutions established in 1959
1959 establishments in South Carolina